Oleiagrimonas soli is a bacterium from the genus of Oleiagrimonas which has been isolated from saline soil contaminated wit oil from Gudao in China.

References

Xanthomonadales
Bacteria described in 2015